Amar Kumar Bauri (born 1978) is an Indian politician and member of the Bharatiya Janata Party. He was Minister of Jharkhand. Earlier he was associated with Jharkhand Vikas Morcha (Prajatantrik) led by Babulal Marandi till Jharkhand Vidhan Sabha election in 2014.
He is member of Jharkhand legislative assembly from Chandankiyari constituency which is reserved for scheduled castes in Bokaro District.

Early life
He was born in year 1978 to Ram Nath Bauri. He passed matriculation from R.D. Tata High School Jamshedpur in 1994, Inter from Co-operative College Jamshedpur in 1997, completed graduation from same Jamshedpur Cooperative College and post graduate in history from Ranchi University in 2005. He also completed Bachelor of Education from the Vinobha Bhave University Hazaribag in 2008.

Details of criminal cases

References

External links
 Jharkhand Cabinet Ministers
 Amar Bauri
 Jharkhand MLA
 Myneta.Info
 Twitter
 Election commission of India

Living people
1978 births
Jharkhand MLAs 2014–2019
Jharkhand MLAs 2019–2024
Bharatiya Janata Party politicians from Jharkhand
Jharkhand Vikas Morcha (Prajatantrik) politicians
State cabinet ministers of Jharkhand